The men's high jump event was part of the track and field athletics programme at the 1948 Summer Olympics. The competition was held on July 30, 1948. Twenty-seven athletes from 16 nations competed. The maximum number of athletes per nation had been set at 3 since the 1930 Olympic Congress. The final was won by John Winter of Australia. It was Australia's first victory in the men's high jump, and only the second time a jumper from outside the United States had won. Bjorn Paulson earned Norway's first medal in the event with a silver. George Stanich took bronze, keeping alive the United States' streak of medaling in every edition of the men's high jump.

Background

This was the 11th appearance of the event, which is one of 12 athletics events to have been held at every Summer Olympics. None of the finalists from the pre-war 1936 Games returned. The American team, which had won 9 of 10 Olympics and had "dominated the world lists in 1948," was favored.

India, Puerto Rico, Singapore, and Uruguay each made their debut in the event. The United States appeared for the 11th time, having competed at each edition of the Olympic men's high jump to that point.

Competition format

The competition used the two-round format introduced in 1912. There were two distinct rounds of jumping with results cleared between rounds. The qualifying round had the bar set at 1.60 metres, 1.70 metres, 1.80 metres, 1.84 metres, and 1.87 metres. All jumpers clearing 1.87 metres in the qualifying round advanced to the final. The final had jumps at 1.80 metres, 1.87 metres, 1.90 metres, 1.95 metres, and 1.98 metres. This competition used the tie-breaker rule of fewer-misses for the first time.

Records

Prior to the competition, the existing world and Olympic records were as follows.

Schedule

All times are British Summer Time (UTC+1)

Results

Qualifying round

Qual. rule: qualification standard 1.87m (Q) or at least best 12 qualified (q).

Final

References

Sources
Organising Committee for the XIV Olympiad, The (1948). The Official Report of the Organising Committee for the XIV Olympiad. LA84 Foundation. Retrieved 7 September 2016.

Athletics at the 1948 Summer Olympics
High jump at the Olympics
Men's events at the 1948 Summer Olympics